The 3092 freguesias of Portugal are listed In alphabetic groups (determined by a freguesia's first letter) in the template below. They are listed according to the following format:
 Municipality
 Freguesia

A complete and unbroken list of freguesias all on one page is not available. A partial list is in :Category:Freguesias of Portugal.

Source: European Commission

 
Portugal 3
Freguesias, Portugal
Freguesias
03